Mundankavu is a village situated  from Chengannur in Alappuzha district, Kerala, India. It lies on the banks of the river Pampa. It is known as Vadakekkara which is situated on the northern banks of River Pampa

Historic and Notable landmarks
 Erapuzha Bridge, (First concrete  bridge in Kerala  under British rule supervised by German Engineer Mr.Marani) across river on MC road is one of the oldest narrow bridges connecting Chengannur municipal town to Tiruvalla taluk. (Mundancavu to Thiruvanvandoor). The present bridge is built in a bottle neck fashion, connecting Mundancavu (Chengannur municipality) to Kallissery. It is to be widened as a 2 lane bridge for modern needs.
 Thazhamon Madhom, the members of this madhom are the traditional head priests of Sabarimala temple.
 Edavana Madhom or Edavana  Mutts
 Mampilly Madhom, Mampilly copperplate Vallabhakotha-chera 973 AD.

Historic importance
Historically, Chengannur village was ruled by "Vanjipuzha Chiefs". The "Vanjipuzha Principality" Palace situated near the river Pamba was located here before it was destroyed. The Vanjipuzha chief are descendants of early rulers of chengannur "Vanchipura Thampurans" .The palace had close architectural similarities to that of Thrichittatt Maha Vishnu Temple. They were  Kshatriyas of Nair origin. Velu Thampi Dalawa before escaping to Mannadi was sheltered by Vanjipuzha Madhom in Adoor. Vanjipuzha Chief has a relevant position in the history of Travancore and they had the right to sit along with the Maharaja of Travancore. They were appointed protectors of the temples at Vaikom and Chengannur.

References

Villages in Alappuzha district